Second All-Ukrainian Congress of Soviets was a congress of soviets (councils) of workers, peasants, Red-army-men deputies that took place in Katerynoslav (Dnipro) on March 17-19, 1918.

Composition
There were 964 delegates. By the end of congress number of delegates increased to 1,250.
 Bolsheviks - 401
 Bolshevik supporters - 27
 Left SRs (Russia and Ukraine, with supporters) - 414
 USDLP (left wing) - 13
 Unaffiliated - 82
 others - 25

The presidium composition was:Skripnik, Ivanov, Kviring, Gamarin[k], Terletsky, Odoyevsky, Boichenko, Tkachinsky, Serdiuk, Medvedev.
 Bolsheviks - 4
 Left SRs (Russia) - 5
 Left SRs (Ukraine) - 1

Agenda
 current moment
 deposition towards the Central Council of Ukraine
 deposition towards war and peace
 organization of armed forces
 Ukraine and Russian SFSR
 government report
 land and finance issues
 election to the Central Executive Committee
 others

Decisions
Despite the sharp interfactional struggle all Bolshevik's resolution have passed.
 the congress approved the Treaty of Brest-Litovsk
 the congress declared independence of Ukraine and also announced that relationships of the Soviet republics will remain within the limits identified earlier
 (current moment) the congress condemned the policy of Central Council of Ukraine demanding withdrawal of the Austria-Germany troops from the territory of Ukraine and calls were placed to combat the widespread establishment of Soviet power. Representatives of left wing Ukrainian parties were proposing to seek a compromise with the Central Council of Ukraine with aim to consolidate national forces, but the majority did not support their propositions
 the congress passed a law about socialization of land that was adopted at the 3rd All-Russian Congress of Soviets, resolutions "About political system", decrees on 8-hour workday and workers' control, about organization of the Red Army of Ukraine

The congress elected 102 members to the Central Executive Committee (CVK):
 Bolsheviks - 47
 SRs (Russia and Ukraine) - 49
 left USDLP - 5
 Lewica - 1
 
Volodymyr Zatonsky was elected Chairman of the CVK.

See also
 1st Congress of the Communist Party (Bolsheviks) of Ukraine

References

External links
Second All-Ukrainian Congress of Soviets at Ukrainian Soviet Encyclopedia
Second All-Ukrainian Congress of Soviets at Encyclopedia of History of Ukraine

Russian Revolution in Ukraine
2
1918 in Ukraine
Political history of Ukraine
1918 in politics
Communism in Ukraine
1918 conferences